Axel Hultman (1869–1935) was a Swedish stage actor, and a film actor of the silent era. He was also a competitive swimmer.

Selected filmography
 Life in the Country (1924)
 First Mate Karlsson's Sweethearts (1925)
 A Sister of Six (1926)
 Charley's Aunt (1926)
 The Million Dollars (1926)
 She Is the Only One (1926)

References

Bibliography
 Tommy Gustafsson. Masculinity in the Golden Age of Swedish Cinema: A Cultural Analysis of 1920s Films. McFarland, 2014.

External links

1869 births
1935 deaths
Swedish male film actors
Swedish male stage actors
Male actors from Stockholm
Swedish swimmers